Ridolfia segetum, called false fennel, corn parsley, or false caraway, is an annual weed of the Mediterranean region. Its height . The stem is erect, striate, and branched. The glabrous leaves are finely divided several times with filiform leaflets, the upper leaves frequently reduced, and the base of the petiole enlarged. The flowers are yellow, arranged in small umbels with almost uniform rays (10-60).

The seeds and leaves contain an essential oil, and the plant has a strong odor. It is used as a herb in the pickle industry. The plant can be eaten in its raw form, or cooked.

Ridolfia segetum is also used for medicinal purposes. It is used in the Mediterranean as a medicine for regulating women’s menstrual periods, and to increase milk flow in nursing mothers. Additional medicinal uses are to prevent constipation, coughing, gas, respiratory tract infections, and lice.

References

External links
Hyppa Weed Science and Agronomy

Apioideae
Edible Apiaceae
Monotypic Apioideae genera